The Levçay is one of the tributaries of the Tartarchay in western Azerbaijan.

Overview
The latter proceeds west through the Tartar and Barda districts and flows into the Kura.

See also
Rivers and lakes in Azerbaijan
Ağdabançay
Turağayçay
Qarqar River

References

Kalbajar District
Rivers of Azerbaijan
Tributaries of the Tartarchay